Jeff Etterbeek (born December 31, 1956) is an American former professional tennis player.

Etterbeek grew up in Holland, Michigan and finished his schooling at Cranbrook. He was an All-American collegiate tennis player for the University of Michigan, winning the Big 10 singles championship in 1978.

In 1980 he featured in the men's doubles main draw of the French Open.

References

External links
 
 

1956 births
Living people
American male tennis players
Michigan Wolverines men's tennis players
Tennis people from Michigan
People from Holland, Michigan
Cranbrook Educational Community alumni